JDS Mikuma (DE-217) was the third ship of the s of Japan Maritime Self-Defense Force.

Development and design 
The main anti-submarine (ASW) weapon was changed from the M/50  ASW rocket launcher to the ASROC anti-submarine missile. The octuple launcher for ASROC was stationed at the mid-deck, and the entire ship design was prescribed by this stationing.

Construction and career
Mikuma was laid down on 17 March 1970 at Mitsui Engineering & Shipbuilding, Osaka and launched on 16 February 1971. The vessel was commissioned on 26 August 1971 into the 34th Escort Corps of the Sasebo District Force with JDS Chikugo.

She joined the 23rd Sasebo District Force Escort Corps on March 24, 1997.

Mikuma was decommissioned on 8 JUly 1997 with the total itinerary during commissioning of 501,738.1 nautical miles.

References

1971 ships
Ships built by Mitsui Engineering and Shipbuilding
Chikugo-class destroyer escorts